Jenna Clark (born 29 September 2001) is a Scottish footballer who plays as a defender for Scottish Women's Premier League club Glasgow City and the Scotland women's national team. She scored on her Scotland debut, a 7–1 win over the Faroe Islands at Hampden Park on 21 September 2021. In 2018, she was named in Glasgow City's squad for a UEFA Women's Champions League match in Cyprus when she was aged 16 and still at school.

References

Living people
2001 births
Scottish women's footballers
Glasgow City F.C. players
Scotland women's international footballers
Scottish Women's Premier League players
Women's association football defenders